High tech refers to "high technology". It may also refer to:

 High-tech architecture, an architectural style that emerged in the 1970s
 HiTech, a computer chess program
 Hi-Tech Automotive, a car builder and automotive design house
 Hi-Tech (G.I. Joe), a fictional character in the G.I. Joe universe
 Hi-Tech (DC Comics) an enemy of Superman in the DC Universe
 Health Information Technology for Economic and Clinical Health Act (HITECH Act)

See also
 High Tech Academy, an academy in Cleveland, Ohio, USA
 High Technology High School, a high school in Lincroft, New Jersey, USA
 Hi-Tek (disambiguation)